Giovanni Giuliano (4 June 1949 – 11 March 2022) was an Italian politician. A member of Forza Italia and The People of Freedom, he served as President of the Province of Imperia from 2001 to 2010. He died on 11 March 2022, at the age of 72.

References

1949 births
2022 deaths
Presidents of the Province of Imperia
Politicians of Liguria
Forza Italia politicians
People from Sanremo